Lomb may refer to:

People
Kató Lomb (1909–2003), Hungarian interpreter, translator, language genius and one of the first simultaneous interpreters
Niklas Lomb (born 1993), German football goalkeeper who plays for Preußen Münster on loan from Bayer Leverkusen

Bausch & Lomb
Bausch & Lomb, American eye health company based in Rochester, New York
Bausch & Lomb Place, skyscraper located in Rochester, New York
Henry Lomb (1828–1908), German-American optician who co-founded Bausch & Lomb (with John Jacob Bausch)

Bausch & Lomb Tennis Championships
2007 Bausch & Lomb Championships
2007 Bausch & Lomb Championships – Singles
2008 Bausch & Lomb Championships
2008 Bausch & Lomb Championships – Doubles
2008 Bausch & Lomb Championships – Singles

Other
Lomb-Scargle periodogram